Grantchester Grind is a novel written by Tom Sharpe, a British novelist born in 1928 who was educated at Lancing College and then at Pembroke College, Cambridge.

Premise
Grantchester Grind follows on from the story of the fictitious Porterhouse College, Cambridge, started in the previous book, Porterhouse Blue.

Plot
Porterhouse is a college which had an incident involving a bedder and the college's only research graduate student which caused the Bull Tower to be severely damaged. Since the college's funds were exhausted by a previous bursar with a tendency to gamble, one of the story's central themes is guided by the Senior Members' attempts to acquire funds for the college.

The new Master, Skullion, the previous Head Porter of the college, is frail after a stroke (or a  'Porterhouse Blue' , hence the previous book's title) and the issues surrounding the death of the previous Master, Sir Godber Evans, prompt his widow to instigate a plan to investigate the death through a planted Fellow, backed by a large, anonymous donation to the college.

Meanwhile, the Dean of the college takes it upon himself to visit prosperous Old Porterthusians (previous members of Porterhouse) in the hope that one is willing and able to become Master if and when Skullion cannot continue. At the same time, the current Bursar is contacted by an American media mogul who seems to be interested in supporting the college without clarifying what it is he wants in return. At the end of the novel the alcoholic Lord Jeremy Pimpole is appointed as Master of the college.

Incidents from Ancestral Vices, another Tom Sharpe novel, are mentioned in crossover.

See also

Tom Sharpe
Porterhouse Blue
Sir Godber Evans
Skullion
Lord Jeremy Pimpole
Poppleton University

References
 

1995 British novels
British satirical novels
Novels by Tom Sharpe
Novels set in University of Cambridge
Secker & Warburg books